Derek Emmanuel Adjei Agyakwa (born 19 December 2001) is a Dutch professional footballer who plays as a defender for  club Port Vale.

Agyakwa began his career in the Netherlands as a youth-team player with Twente, and spent January 2020 until June 2022 contracted to English club Watford, whilst spending the first half of the 2020–21 season on loan at Como in Italy. He then moved on to Port Vale and was loaned out to Chorley in September 2022.

Career

Watford
Agyakwa joined Twente from local club Amsterdam, but was released after two years in Twente's academy. He joined English Premier League club Watford on an initial six-month contract after passing a two-week trial in January 2020. In June, his contract was extended by a year. On 16 September 2020, Agyakwa made his professional debut, playing the first half in Watford's EFL Cup victory over Oxford United. On 5 October, Agyakwa signed a new two-year contract with Watford and was loaned out to Italian Serie C side Como for the 2020–21 season. He played his first match for Como on 20 October in a 3–2 win against Lucchese, and received a yellow card for what he later claimed had been a dive by the opposition forward. He was sent off during a 2–2 draw with Olbia at the Stadio Giuseppe Sinigaglia on 25 November. In January 2021, the loan was ended early due to a mutually agreed termination. Having only appeared in a match-day squad as an unused substitute in one FA Cup game throughout the 2021–22 season, Agyakwa left Vicarage Road after being released upon the expiry of his contract.

Port Vale
On 26 July 2022, Agyakwa signed for EFL League One club Port Vale following a successful trial period. On 13 September 2022, he joined National League North club Chorley on a short-term loan deal, where manager Andy Preece felt he could "add vital competition and depth" to the squad. He featured in just one FA Cup game for the "Magpies", before returning to Vale Park to make his debut for "Valiants" in a 2–0 victory over Wolverhampton Wanderers U21 in the EFL Trophy on 18 October. He made his league debut on 18 March, coming on for Will Forrester 35 minutes into a 3–2 home defeat to Burton Albion.

Personal life
Born in the Netherlands, Agyakwa is of Ghanaian descent.

Career statistics

References

2001 births
Living people
Footballers from Amsterdam
Dutch footballers
Dutch sportspeople of Ghanaian descent
Association football defenders
FC Twente players
Watford F.C. players
Como 1907 players
Port Vale F.C. players
Chorley F.C. players
Serie C players
National League (English football) players
Dutch expatriate footballers
Expatriate footballers in England
Dutch expatriate sportspeople in England
Expatriate footballers in Italy
Dutch expatriate sportspeople in Italy